Robert Moglan (born 5 July 1996) is a Romanian professional footballer who plays for Oțelul Galați as a defender.

References

External links
 
 

1996 births
Living people
Sportspeople from Galați
Romanian footballers
Association football defenders
Romania youth international footballers
Liga I players
Liga II players
ASC Oțelul Galați players
CS Afumați players
AFC Dacia Unirea Brăila players